Rebuild the Dream is an American center-left political organization founded in June 2011 by former Obama Administration advisor Van Jones and the group MoveOn.org.
It aims to counter the Tea Party movement.

Principles 
The group's central principles are outlined in the "Contract for the American Dream".

 Invest in America's infrastructure.
 Create 21st century energy jobs.
 Invest in public education.
 Offer Medicare for all.
 Make work pay.
 Secure Social Security.
 Return to fairer tax rates.
 End the wars and invest at home.
 Tax Wall Street speculation.
 Strengthen democracy.

Membership 
Jones said on July 31, 2011 that the group had 127,000 members.

References

External links 
 Organization's website

Political organizations based in the United States